Robert A. King was an American football coach.  He was the fifth head football coach at Wabash College in Crawfordsville, Indiana, serving for one season, in 1890, and compiling a record of 0–3.

Head coaching record

References

Year of birth missing
Year of death missing
Wabash Little Giants football coaches
Hamilton College (New York) alumni